The Faculty of Law is a faculty of the University of Windsor in Windsor, Ontario, Canada. The first class of students matriculated in 1968, and the current building was opened in 1970. The Faculty has grown immensely over the past 50 years, increasing its national profile through its innovations in research and from thousands of alumni across Canada and the world. The 2017 endowment to the Faculty of Law was $10.2 million. The Faculty is also the current academic host institution of the Canadian Bar Review (CBR), the most frequently cited journal by the Supreme Court of Canada. 

The Faculty of Law embraces the principles of Access to Justice in all aspects of its operation, including its admissions policy, faculty hiring, faculty research and scholarship, and its curriculum. Transnational Legal issues, international trade and finance, and international law are other key area of research and teaching interest due to the Faculty's close proximity with Detroit and several universities in Michigan.

Windsor Law is home to the Law, Technology and Entrepreneurship Clinic (LTEC), which is a clinical project conducted by several law professors who specialize in technology law. LTEC's goal is to provide upper year law students with a unique clinical legal education experience, and in turn support entrepreneurship and innovation in the Windsor-Essex region. LTEC provides community legal education workshops on aspects of business law and intellectual property law (patents, copyright and trademarks). In addition, LTEC provides legal services to eligible clients from across the Windsor-Essex area in matters pertaining to business law and/or intellectual property law. LTEC's success has grown immensely over the past years, and will continue to be a major academic and research focus for the Faculty into the future.

Windsor Law publishes two journals: the Windsor Yearbook of Access to Justice and the student run law journal Windsor Review of Legal and Social Issues. Students can take advantage of faculty expertise in Aboriginal Law, Commercial/Corporate Law, Evidence Law, Fiduciary Law, Freedom of Religion & Expression, Human Rights Law, Insurance Law, Intellectual Property Law, International Law, Labour Law, Poverty Law, Remedies, and Tax Law.

Admissions
Admissions to the Faculty of Law have become increasingly more competitive in recent years as the profile of the school has expanded and as more students seek application to Canadian law schools. Each year around 2000 applications for the J.D. program at Windsor Law are received for the 165 places in the first-year class, an acceptance rate of 8%. For the Canadian & American Dual J.D. program, 700 applications are received for 85 places in the Dual J.D. first-year class.

The Faculty of Law takes a holistic approach in admitting students that considers seven unique factors:

 Undergraduate performance: Undergraduate GPA, academic awards and prizes, the level of degrees obtained;
 Work experience: Qualifications, vocational skills, organizational and administrative skills;
 Community involvement: Religious/athletic/social/community service activities;
 Personal accomplishments: Extracurricular activities, hobbies, artistic or athletic accomplishments, language skills;
 Career objectives of the applicant and how they intend to employ their legal education;
 Special personal considerations: Illness, bereavement, family responsibilities, other special circumstances;
 LSAT score

Program

The flagship J.D. program offered at the Faculty of Law comprises mandatory first year courses as mandated by the Law Society of Upper Canada. Second and third year students can choose from a variety of courses in order to specialize in areas of particular interest to them. 

The compulsory first year curriculum includes:
Constitutional Law
Contract Law
Criminal Law and Procedure
Legal Research and Writing
Property Law
Access to Justice (half semester)
Indigenous Legal Orders (half semester)

The Faculty also offers a dual J.D. degree program with the University of Detroit Mercy which grants both a Canadian and American JD. The program is completed in three years, including summers, with students taking courses at both the University of Windsor and the University of Detroit Mercy to fulfil the requirements for both degrees.

Windsor Law offers a joint J.D./M.B.A. program with the Odette School of Business.

In 2010, the faculty began offering a joint Master of Social Work/Juris Doctor (M.S.W./J.D.) program. Students can take either three or four years to complete the dual degree. A Master of Social Work is normally a two-year professional program without a Bachelor of Social Work; it is a one-year program if entrants already hold a B.S.W. degree.

In 2016, the first class of students were admitted to the L.L.M of Windsor Law.

Law Student Clubs 
A number of student-run clubs and organizations exist within the Faculty:

 Black Law Student Association (BLSA)
 Health Law Club
 Jewish Student Association
 Middle Eastern Law Student Association
 Old and Wise Law Students (OWLS)
 Windsor Health Law Club
 Windsor Law Alternative Dispute Resolution Club
 Windsor Law Animal Justice
 Windsor Law Debate Club
 Women of Colour in Law
 Women and the Law

Facilities 
In 2018, the University of Windsor announced that the Faculty of Law building would undergo a $35 million renovation. The new construction began at the end of 2020 with an initial timeline of 2 years. However, due to delays caused by the Covid-19 pandemic, the project is expected to be completed in the summer of 2023.

The finished building will have the capacity to accommodate 720 students.

Journals
The Windsor Review of Legal and Social Issues (WRLSI) is one of the few multi-disciplinary legal academic student-run journals in Canada. First published in 1989, the WRLSI was initially an annual publication. However, due to the increase in submissions received and recognition of its journal, the WRLSI now publishes two volumes each year containing essays from academics, the judiciary, practitioners, law students, and university students both at the graduate and undergraduate levels. As an inter-disciplinary law journal, the WRLSI strives to use the study of law as a vehicle for social change. Its journal endeavours to be a resource for professionals, students and academics. The theme of "Access to Justice" maintained by the Faculty of Law at the University of Windsor has influenced our mandate to publish papers that explore law in its social context, and the impact that social issues can have on the law. Domestic and international concerns relevant to Canadian society also play a key focus in articles selected for publication. Legal libraries both nationally and globally subscribe to the WRLSI. The legal journal has also been made available through electronic databases such as Lexis Advance Quicklaw, Westlaw, and Hein Online.

While the journal publishes primarily academics and practitioners, the Annual Canadian Law Student Conference is a unique annual event which showcases the research and scholarship of LL.B., J.D., LL.M., and Ph.D. students across Canada, and provides a forum for discussion and feedback from practitioners and peers. The Windsor Review of Legal and Social Issues invites all law students to submit original, scholarly work on any legal topic with a Canadian nexus to be considered for presentation at the 5th Annual Canadian Law Student Conference. Papers should not exceed 20,000 words including footnotes. Footnotes should conform to the Canadian Guide to Uniform Legal Citation (McGill Guide, 7th edition). Two papers will be chosen as the “Best Student Papers” which are eligible for an award of $250 each. These awards are generously sponsored by Torys LLP.

Created in 1979, the Windsor Yearbook of Access to Justice was the earliest Canadian journal devoted to the trans-cultural and international study of individuals and groups excluded from the protections of the domestic or international legal orders. The Yearbook is independently refereed, publishes French and English essays and book reviews, is faculty-run and is supported by a distinguished Advisory Board. The Yearbook encourages a wide diversity of essays from a broad range of disciplines, such as anthropology, sociology, philosophy, psychology, history and comparative literature as well as law.

The Faculty of Law at the University of Windsor, publishes the Windsor Yearbook of Access to Justice semi-annually with the assistance of grants from the Ontario Law Foundation and support from the Faculty of Law of the University of Windsor. From time to time, additional support has included grants from the Social Sciences and Humanities Research Council of Canada. The Yearbook is indexed and abstracted in the following: CSA Sociological Abstracts, Canadian Association of Learned Journals, Current Law Index, Current Law Journal Content, Index to Canadian Legal Literature, Index to Legal Periodicals and Books, IndexMaster, CPI-Q, Hein Online, LegalTrac, Lexis Advanced Quicklaw, Ulrich's Periodicals Directory, Westlaw & Wilson Web. The Yearbook has continuously been ranked as one of the top subject-specific law reviews in Canada.

Clinics

The Faculty of Law takes pride in empowering students to make meaningful contributions to the community while conducting their studies.

The Faculty, in conjunction with Legal Aid Ontario, runs a community legal clinic in downtown Windsor called Legal Assistance of Windsor. The clinic is staffed by lawyers, social workers, law students, and social work students, and aims to meet the legal needs of persons traditionally denied access to justice.  This clinic provides services in the areas of landlord-tenant, social benefits, and immigration and refugee law. It also assists clients in applications for compensation from the Criminal Injuries Compensation Board of Ontario.

The University of Windsor runs a second legal clinic, Community Legal Aid, on the campus of the University.  This clinic is a Student Legal Aid Services Society (SLASS) clinic, which is staffed primarily by volunteer law students and overseen by supervising lawyers, called review counsel.  This clinic operates primarily in the areas of criminal law, landlord tenant law, and small claims matters. The clinic offers free legal services to those who qualify financially and all full-time undergraduate students of the University.

In conjunction with the University of Detroit Mercy School of Law, the Faculty has collaboratively created the International Intellectual Property Law Clinic (IP Clinic). The IP Clinic is the only intellectual property clinic that services clients in multiple jurisdictions while allowing students to participate in the practice of international IP law. The IP clinic has received certification from both the United States Patent and Trademark Office (USPTO) and the Canadian Intellectual Property Office (CIPO).

The focus of the IP Clinic is to provide intellectual property advice and services to small business and individuals working on entrepreneurial projects, including student entrepreneurs and innovators. Participating students gain experience from conducting patent and trademark searches, drafting and filing prosecution applications, and providing advise on international intellectual property matters.

Another partnership with a Michigan university, Wayne State University Law School, lead to the creation of the Transnational Environmental Law Clinic. This practical clinic allows students to gain experience with international environmental legal issues surrounding air quality, environmental justice, Great Lakes water quality and quantity, invasive species and renewable energy.

Advocacy programs 
Students at the Faculty of Law participate in one moot during their first year of studies if they are enrolled in the JD Program, and two moots if enrolled in the JD/JD Program. Participation in these moots enables students to implement classroom learning through appellate-style advocacy. The four top advocates of the first year single JD moot compete in the Windsor Law Lerners Moot during their second year, which is held annually in January. The Lerners Moot is judged by a panel of three judges from different divisions of Ontario courts. Upper year students interested in oral advocacy may participate in a range of national and international competitive moots and advocacy competitions. Some competitive moots and advocacy competitions may also be taken for academic credit.

Several of the national moots and advocacy competitions that the Faculty of Law participates in are:

Aboriginal Moot (Kawaskimhon)
Arnup Cup Trial Advocacy Competition
BLG/Cavalluzzo Labour Moot
Bowman National Tax Moot (Donald G.)
2019 - 1st Place Team, Best Factum - Appellant
2018 - Best Advocate
2017 - Best Factum - Respondent
2015 - 1st Place Team
2011 - 1st Place Team
Canadian Client Consultation Competition
2014-2015 - 1st Place Team
Canadian Competition Law Moot
Canadian National Negotiation Competition
Diversity Moot (Julius Alexander Isaac)
2010 - 2011 - First Place Team
Gale Cup Moot
2012 - 4th Place Team
2017 - 4th Place Team
INADR Mediation Competition
International Criminal Court Moot Competition
Jessup International Law Moot (Philip C.)
Matthews Dinsdale Arbitration
Ontario Trial Lawyers Association Moot
Oxford International Intellectual Property Moot
Walsh Family Law Negotiation
Walsh Family Law Moot
2015-2016 1st Place Team
Winkler Class Actions Moot
2014-2015 First Place Team
Wilson Moot
2012 - 2013 - 1st Place Team
Williams & Shier Environmental
WTO Dispute Resolution Moot

Student services 
Student health and well-being are top priorities for the Faculty of Law. Windsor Law has a full-time clinical therapist to assist students with any issues they may face during their time studying at the Faculty. This school has also significantly increased the availability of mental health and wellbeing services, and has taken great steps to ensure that institutional support will continue to be maintained for these services. Fitness bootcamps, board-games club, the Mental Health Awareness Committee and the Pro Bono Students Society are a number of student-lead organizations that also contribute towards improving the accessibility of mental health and wellbeing services.

Financial support for students in need has been another priority of the Faculty of Law. Almost $3 million is awarded to students with financial need in bursaries every year.

Deans

See also
 List of law schools in Canada

References

External links
 University of Windsor Faculty of Law
 Paul Martin Law Library
 Students' Law Society
 University of Windsor
 University of Windsor Students' Alliance
 CanLII - Canadian Legal Information Institute

Educational institutions established in 1969
Windsor
University of Windsor
1969 establishments in Ontario